Hibbertia hamulosa is a species of flowering plant in the family Dilleniaceae and is endemic to the south coast of Western Australia. It is a shrub with somewhat crowded, thick, linear leaves and golden yellow flowers with five to eight stamens fused at their bases, all on one side of two densely hairy carpels.

Description
There are five to eight stamens, fused at the base on one side of the two densely hairy carpels that each contain two ovules. Flowering mostly occurs between July and October.

Taxonomy
Hibbertia hamulosa was first formally described in 2000 by Judith R. Wheeler in the journal Nuytsia from specimens collected by Ruurd Dirk Hoogland on the south-west slope of East Mount Barren in 1971. The specific epithet (hamulosa) means "armed with small hooks", referring to the hairs on the outside of the sepals.

Distribution and habitat
This species grows on rocky or gravelly slopes on the south coast of Western Australia between Bremer Bay and Esperance.

Conservation status
Hibbertia hamulosa is classified as "not threatened" by the Western Australian Government Department of Parks and Wildlife.

See also
List of Hibbertia species

References

hamulosa
Flora of Western Australia
Plants described in 2000